

Tumors of the Stomach 

Tumors of the stomach are known as gastric tumors, and can be either benign or malignant (gastric cancer). These tumors arise from the cells of the gastric mucosa which lines the stomach. Typically, most gastric tumors are cancerous and not detected until a later stage for various reasons.

What is a Tumor? 
There are two distinct types of tumors: Benign and Malignant. Both types of tumors share a number of general characteristics, the broadest being that they are an abnormal proliferation of cells. The main difference between the two types is what happens once the tumor has started growing. In a benign tumor, the proliferated cells stay in one location where they do not impact or spread to other surrounding tissues. Malignant tumors, on the other hand, are capable of spreading throughout the entire body, causing new tumors to appear. This process is called metastasis, and is a hallmark of cancerous tumors.

Typical Cell Growth 
Generally speaking, all cells grow and divide in order to help the organism grow larger, or to replace dead or damaged cells. Depending on the type of cell, they either go through mitosis or meiosis, creating diploid or haploid daughter cells, respectively. In cells that complete mitosis, after they divide, they enter a phase called interphase. Interphase is the longest part of the cell cycle and is composed of G1, S, and G2 phases. During this time, the cell completes a series of growth, DNA replication, and more growth to ensure they are ready to divide again eventually.

In order to make sure that this cycle runs smoothly, there are a series of checkpoints that the cell reaches to ensure that DNA replication has been completed correctly and that the cell is of correct size. These checkpoints include an un-replicated DNA checkpoint, a spindle assembly checkpoint, a chromosome-segregation checkpoint, and various DNA damage checkpoints. Table 1 below describes different cell cycle checkpoints and their various purposes.    

In mammalian organisms, the cell cycle is regulated through interactions of cyclin-dependent kinases (CDKs) and cyclins. CDKs are always present in the cell, while cyclins are in a constant cycle of degradation and synthesis. Although CDKs are always present in a cell, their natural state is in the inactive form, which is where the cyclins come into play. In a normal cell, each phase of the cell cycle will produce unique types of cyclins which bind to specific cyclin-dependent kinases at each checkpoint. Once they are bound, the complex is now activated and the CDK is able to proceed with phosphorylation.

Checkpoints that monitor for DNA damage are regulated in a slightly different manner. They still involve the use of cyclins and CDKs, but they also involve the use of a transcription factor called p53, a crucial part of cell cycle regulation. In a cell where everything has proceeded normally, p53 will be degraded and have essentially no function. If, however, there is any damage, p53 will become stabilized, allowing it to bind to the damaged DNA. In this case, the cell cycle will halt long enough for the damage to be repaired, or if the damage is severe enough, the cell will undergo apoptosis.

Abnormal Cell Growth 
In the case of tumors, the cells display a level of abnormal growth. In most cases, this abnormal growth comes from an error in the cell cycle checkpoints. There are three general errors that occur within the cell cycle to cause abnormal cell growth. The first error is unscheduled proliferation, essentially refers to the cell continuing to grow and divide without the proper signaling from mitosis. Genomic instability, the second error, refers to mutations within the genome which causes errors in the replication or repair of the gene. Lastly, chromosomal instability is caused by mutations which disrupt the normal segregation of chromosomes in mitosis or meiosis. Although caused by different abnormalities, each of these errors is in some way mediated by a mistake in cyclin-dependent kinases. In a healthy cell, the interactions between cyclins and cyclin-dependent kinases are essential for either halting the cell cycle or allowing the cell to continue through a checkpoint. In abnormal cells, however, acquired mutations allow the cells to bypass these checkpoints by deregulating the cyclins and CDKs, even if there have been significant errors.

Tumor Growth in the Stomach 
Although it is possible to have a tumor that is benign, in the case of gastric tumors, only about 5-10% end up being non-cancerous. With that being the case, It is very important to learn the causes of stomach tumors, risk factors, and their signs and symptoms.

Origins of Gastric Tumors 

Unfortunately, the early anatomical changes in the lining of the stomach that lead to cancer are rarely noticeable. The lining of the stomach is made up of a simple columnar epithelium which folds into what are called gastric glands. Within these glands are four different cell types: goblet cells, parietal cells, chief cells, and enteroendocrine cells. Mutations in any of these cell types can begin the process of uncontrolled cell proliferation, ultimately leading to the formation of a tumor. It is also important to note that depending on where in the stomach the tumor starts, signs and symptoms as well as treatment options may differ.

Types of Gastric Tumors 

 Adenocarcinoma 
 Primary Gastric Lymphoma
 Gastrointestinal Stromal Tumor (GIST)
 Neuroendocrine (Carcinoid) Tumors

Risk Factors 

 Smoking
 Helicobacter pylori infection.
 Diet low in fruits and vegetables.
 Diet high in salt and nitrates.
 Polyps
 Genetic alterations - p53 mutation, micro-satellite instability, E-cadherin gene
 Previous radiation
 Pernicious anaemia

Signs and Symptoms 

 Dysphagia
 Indigestion
 Nausea
 Vomiting
 Vomiting blood
 Abdominal pain
 Loss of appetite
 Abdominal swelling
 Passing black stool

References 

Stomach
Tumor localization
Wikipedia Student Program